This is a list of Confederate Railroads in operation or used by the Confederate States of America during the American Civil War. See also Confederate railroads in the American Civil War. At the outset of the war, the Confederacy possessed the third largest set of railroads of any nation in the world, with about 9,000 miles of railroad track. Southern companies, towns, cities as well as state governments were heavy investors in railroad companies, which were typically designed as feeder lines linking farming centers to port cities.

Railroads and railroad companies
Alabama and Florida Railroad
Alabama and Mississippi Rivers Railroad
Alabama and Tennessee River Railroad
Alabama Coal Company Railroad
Alexandria and Cheneyville Railroad
Alexandria, Loudoun and Hampshire Railroad
Allen’s Plantation Railroad
Atlanta and West Point Railroad
Atlantic and Gulf Railroad
Atlantic and North Carolina Railroad
Atlantic, Tennessee and Ohio Railroad
Augusta and Milledgeville Railroad
Augusta and Savannah Railroad
Baton Rouge, Grosse Tete and Opelousa Railroad
Baltimore and Ohio Railroad
Blue Ridge Railroad
Blue Ridge Railroad of South Carolina
Brunswick and Albany Railroad
Brunswick and Florida Railroad
Buffalo Bayou, Brazos and Colorado Railroad
Cahaba, Marion and Greensboro Railroad
Central Railroad of Georgia
Central Southern Railroad
Centreville Military Railroad
Charlotte and South Carolina Railroad
Charleston and Savannah Railroad
Cheraw and Darlington Railroad
Clinton and Port Hudson Railroad
Clover Hill Railroad
East Tennessee and Georgia Railroad
East Tennessee and Virginia Railroad
Eastern Texas Railroad
Edgefield and Kentucky Railroad
Etowah Railroad
Florida Railroad
Florida, Atlantic and Gulf Central Railroad
Galveston, Houston and Henderson Railroad
Galveston and Houston Junction Railroad
Georgia Railroad
Gordon's Mine Railroad
Grand Gulf and Port Gibson Railroad
Greenville and Columbia Railroad
Houston & Texas Central Railroad
Houston Tap and Brazoria Railroad
Jefferson and Lake Pontchartrain Railroad
King’s Mountain Railroad
Knoxville and Kentucky Railroad
Laurens Railroad
Louisville and Nashville Railroad
Macon and Brunswick Railroad
Macon and Western Railroad
Manassas Gap Railroad
McMinnville and Manchester Railroad
Memphis and Charleston Railroad
Memphis and Little Rock Railroad
Memphis and Ohio Railroad
Memphis, Clarksville and Louisville Railroad
Memphis, El Paso and Pacific Railroad
Mexican Gulf Railroad
Milledgeville Railroad
Mississippi Central Railroad
Mississippi, Gainesville and Tuscaloosa Railroad
Mississippi and Tennessee Railroad
Mississippi, Ouachita and Red River Railroad
Mobile and Girard Railroad
Mobile and Great Northern Railroad
Mobile and Ohio Railroad
Montevallo Coal Railroad
Montgomery and Eufaula Railroad
Montgomery and West Point Railroad
Muscogee Railroad
Nashville and Chattanooga Railroad
Nashville and Decatur Railroad
Nashville and Northwestern Railroad
New Orleans and Carrollton Railroad
New Orleans and Ohio Railroad
New Orleans, Jackson and Great Northern Railroad
New Orleans, Opelousas and Great Western Railroad
Norfolk and Petersburg Railroad
North Carolina Railroad
Northeast and Southwest Alabama Railroad
Northeastern Railroad
Northwestern Virginia Railroad
Orange and Alexandria Railroad
Pensacola and Georgia Railroad
Pensacola and Mobile Railroad
Petersburg Railroad
Piedmont Railroad
Pontchartrain Railroad
Raleigh and Gaston Railroad
Raymond Railroad
Red River Railroad
Richmond and Danville Railroad
Richmond and Petersburg R.R. Company
Richmond and York River Railroad
Richmond, Fredericksburg and Potomac Railroad
Roanoke Valley Railroad
Rogersville and Jefferson Railroad
Rome Railroad
San Antonio and Mexican Gulf Railroad
Savannah, Albany and Gulf Railroad
Seaboard and Roanoke Railroad
Selma and Meridian Railroad
Shelby Iron Company Railroad
South and North Alabama Railroad
South Carolina Railroad
Southside Railroad
South Western Railroad
Southern Railroad of Mississippi
Southern Pacific Railroad
Spartanburg and Union Railroad
Spring Hill Railroad
Tallahassee Railroad
Tennessee and Alabama Railroad
Tennessee and Alabama Central Railroad
Tennessee Coal and Railroad
Texas and New Orleans Railroad
Tuckahoe and James River Railroad
Tuskegee Railroad
Upson County Railroad
Vicksburg, Shreveport and Texas Railroad
Virginia and Tennessee Railroad
Virginia Central Railroad
Washington County Railroad
West Feliciana Railroad
Western & Atlantic Railroad of the State of Georgia  gauge
Western Railroad of Alabama
Western North Carolina Railroad
Wills Valley Railroad
Wilmington, Charlotte and Rutherford Railroad
Wilmington and Manchester Railroad
Wilmington and Weldon Railroad
Winchester and Alabama Railroad
Winchester and Potomac Railroad

Railroad tunnels 
 Blue Ridge Tunnel

External links 

 Confederate Railroads

Notes

References 
 Black, Robert C., The Railroads of the Confederacy, University of North Carolina Press, 1952.
 Gabel, Christopher R., Rails To Oblivion: The Decline of Confederate Railroads in the Civil War. U.S. Army Command And General Staff College, CGSC Press Publications, 2002.

Economic history of the American Civil War
Economic history of the Confederate States of America 
Transportation in the Confederate States of America
United States economic history-related lists
Civil War topics
Military equipment of the Confederate States of America
Confederate States of America
American Civil War-related lists